Gunman in Joseon is a 2014 South Korean television series starring Lee Joon-gi, Nam Sang-mi, Jeon Hye-bin, Han Joo-wan, and Yu Oh-seong. It aired on KBS2 from June 25 to September 4, 2014 on Wednesdays and Thursdays at 21:55 for 22 episodes.

Synopsis
The story begins in 1876, the third year of Emperor Gojong's reign. It is a time of great upheaval and rapid modernization, with conflict brewing between the two leading political factions, the Sugu (conservative) and the Kaehwa (enlightenment). Those on the Kaehwa side support Gojong's enlightenment policies during this time of change; Joseon was known as a hermit kingdom through the nineteenth century, keen to isolate itself from foreign influence. In previous years, Joseon had rejected Western overtures to open trade lines, which had led to military clashes with American and French forces. While newer ideology advocated a more open policy, it had yet to take root. Adding to the mounting tensions, recently Gojong's Kaehwa supporters have begun, one by one, to fall victim to a mysterious figure toting a brand-new style of gun.

Park Yoon-kang (Lee Joon-gi) is the son of the last great swordsman of nineteenth century Joseon. After the tragic death of his father and the enslavement of his younger sister, Yoon-kang trades his sword for a Western-made lever action rifle as he embarks on a revenge mission, but ends up becoming a hero for the people.

Cast

Main
Lee Joon-gi as Park Yoon-kang/Hasegawa Hanjo
Seo Dong-hyun as young Park Yoon-kang
Estranged from his father Park Jin-han, Yoon-kang lives an indolent life, drinking and flirting at the gisaeng house while performing daredevil acts with his sword for extra tips. Like his father who is a legendary swordsman, Yoon-kang himself is a highly skilled swordsman but went through life with little ambition or direction, which his father often admonished him for. After Jin-han is killed by conspirators then falsely branded a traitor, his children are also punished. The girl Yoon-kang loves, Soo-in, helps him escape arrest, but while on a boat he is shot, falls into the water, and is presumed dead. Fortunately, Yoon-kang is rescued by a group of men heading to Japan, and three years later, he returns to Joseon under the assumed name Hasegawa Hanjo to embark on his revenge mission and has traded his sword for a rifle.

Nam Sang-mi as Jung Soo-in
Soo-in is a feisty and intelligent noblewoman, despite her sheltered upbringing. Though she retains her wonder at modern gadgets such as the camera, Soo-in's heartbreak over Yoon-kang's "death" has made her jaded at the seeming pointlessness of changing the world for the better. But upon meeting Hasegawa Hanjo, she instantly recognizes him as Yoon-kang despite his repeated denials. Through the twists of fate that follow, Soo-in develops into a strong, tough modern woman.

Jeon Hye-bin as Choi Hye-won
A cold-hearted, unapproachable merchant's daughter. Hye-won desires to acquire enough wealth to hold the world in her hand, but things change when she inconveniently falls for the Japanese trader Hasegawa Hanjo, who unbeknownst to her is Yoon-kang, her father's enemy. As a child, she was a slave who was raped by her master and beaten by her mistress.

Han Joo-wan as Kim Ho-kyung
He leads a lonely existence due to his status as the illegitimate son of Minister Kim Byung-je. Thus, Ho-kyung dreams of revolution and a new world after being influenced by Kaehwa-aligned politicians and scholars. Ho-kyung is close to the Jung family, who treat him as a beloved son, but the feelings he harbors for Soo-in are romantic rather than brotherly.

Yu Oh-seong as Choi Won-shin
A merchant and assassin with an expressionless face and a heart full of ambition which was driven by a past of being humiliated by those in higher ranks. He is involved in a conspiracy against the king, picking off the latter's allies one by one with his rifle. Won-shin is also Hye-won's father and his daughter's enslavement is a source of his hatred for the ruling elite class.

Supporting
Choi Jae-sung as Park Jin-han
A stern but principled man, he is Yoon-kang and Yeon-ha's father. As head of the king's royal guard, his job includes tracking down those plotting to interfere with the king's reforms. However, his loyalty to the king and dedication to his job has put his family in the cross hairs of the very people he tracks down.

Kim Hyun-soo as Park Yeon-ha
Yoon-kang's younger sister. Upon the court's orders, she becomes a slave after her father is posthumously branded a traitor.

Choi Cheol-ho as Moon Il-do
Park Jin-han's second-in-command. Three years after Jin-han's death, Emperor Gojong orders him to secretly reopen the gunman case. He remained loyal to the Park family all these years and steadfastly believed in his former superior's innocence.

Lee Dong-hwi as Han Jung-hoon
A clumsy timid and quite greedy police officer serving under Il-do and also Yoon-kang's best friend. He realizes Hanjo's real identity as Yoon-kang and agrees to secretly help his friend.

Choi Ji-na as Park Jin-han's wife
When Yoon-kang was a young boy and Yeon-ha a baby, their mother was kidnapped and used as bait by a group of bandits her husband was after. She sacrificed herself to prevent them from searching their house for the children. For many years Yoon-kang blamed his father Park Jin-han for not complying with the ransom demand to stop advancing his troops in order to spare his wife's life, believing that was the reason she was killed.

Um Hyo-sup as Jung Hwe-ryung 
The official state interpreter, and Soo-in's father. He and Park Jin-han became friends after the latter saved his life during one of his travels, so Hwe-ryung welcomes Jin-han's children into his household to hide them from their father's enemies.

Kim Ye-ryeong as Lady Kim
Jung Hwe-ryung's wife and Soo-in's mother. She worries that her daughter has disconnected herself from the world since Yoon-kang's death.

Ahn Ji-hyun as Jan-yi
Soo-in's loyal maid.

Nam Myung-ryul as Hyun Am
Leader of the Kaehwa faction, who is assassinated while giving a speech to his followers. Among his pupils were Soo-in and Ho-kyung. Hyun Am wrote a book of his teachings and left it in Soo-in's keeping before his death.

Kim Jung-hak as Oh Kyung
The last living Kaehwa scholar who becomes the assassins' next target.

Choi Jong-won as Kim Jwa-young
Nobleman who is the head of the powerful Andong Kim clan. He is Gojong's most powerful political opposition and is the leader of the conservative Sugu faction.

Ahn Suk-hwan as Kim Byung-je
One of the top state councilors in Gojong's court. He is a member of the Sugu faction.

Lee Min-woo as Emperor Gojong
Ha Ji-eun as Queen Min
Choi Jae-hwan as Sang-chu / Sato
Hanjo's loyal Joseon-born interpreter and servant. He chooses to remain with Hanjo despite being allowed to leave.

Ryohei Otani as Ganemaru
A Japanese man who is part of Hanjo's entourage, but doesn't know his real identity. 
Yoon Hee-seok as Kim Ok-gyun
The man who rescued Yoon-kang from near death and took him to Japan. He is a Kaehwa scholar.

Jin Sung as Sung-gil
One of Won-shin's assassins.

Kang Sung-jin as Kim Moo-deok
One of Won-shin's assassins.

Park Jae-min as Jong-tae
Traveling peddler turned assassin.

Jung Geun as Son Taek-soo
Won-shin's mole in the police force who was bribed to give false testimony that Jin-han was a traitor.

Kim Ga-eun as Im Je-mi
A slave girl who enters Hanjo's employ and teaches Ganemaru the Korean language.

Kim Eung-soo as Yamamoto Shinji
An influential Japanese merchant who has ties with the Japanese government.
Song Ji-ho as Nakamura
Seo Dong-won as Gunpowder technician

Production
Lee Joon-gi, Nam Sang-mi and Choi Jae-sung previously starred together in Time Between Dog and Wolf (2007).

Filming locations included Andong, Buan, Gochang, Mungyeong, Yeongju, Masan, and Sokcho.

All of the guns in the drama are props, and are just used to fire blanks. Ryu Young Jae, who is in charge of special effects      said, "Use of real firearms in movies and broadcasts is prohibited in South Korea. The guns have been borrowed from Hong Kong". Due to various conditions, it's very difficult to obtain the appropriate firearms.

Original soundtrack

Ratings

Awards and nominations

International broadcast

See also
Gapsin Coup

References

External links
  
 
 
 

2014 South Korean television series debuts
2014 South Korean television series endings
Korean Broadcasting System television dramas
Television series set in the Joseon dynasty
South Korean action television series
Television series by KBS Media
South Korean historical television series
Martial arts television series